Karen Lynne Keiser (born September 29, 1947) is an American journalist and politician of the Democratic Party. She represents the 33rd Legislative District in the Washington State Senate, which contains parts of Burien, Normandy Park, SeaTac, Kent and Des Moines.

Senator Keiser has served in the Washington state senate since 2001 and served in the Washington House of Representatives from 1996 to 2001.

References

Further reading
 Biography on Washington State Legislature website

1947 births
20th-century American politicians
20th-century American women politicians
21st-century American politicians
21st-century American women politicians
Living people
Democratic Party members of the Washington House of Representatives
Politicians from Sioux City, Iowa
Democratic Party Washington (state) state senators
Women state legislators in Washington (state)